Altynsarin is a district of Kostanay Region in northern Kazakhstan. The administrative center of the district is the auyl of Obagan. Population:

References

Districts of Kazakhstan
Kostanay Region